Corus nyassanus is a species of beetle in the family Cerambycidae. It was described by Breuning in 1938. The species has been reported in Malawi.

References

nyassanus
Beetles described in 1938